Neos Kafkasos is a village in Florina Regional Unit, Macedonia, Greece.

Following the Greek-Turkish population exchange, the Greek state organised the resettlement of Greek refugees and in the Florina area a new border village was built for them called Neos Kafkasos. In 1926 there were 155 refugee families from the Caucasus in the village. The refugee families had came from the province of Kars Oblast (later ceded to Turkey) where under Russian rule (1878-1918) they arrived from Ottoman Pontus and were resettled by the imperial government, serving as border guards on the Ottoman-Russian frontier. The Greek census (1928) recorded 604 village inhabitants in Neos Kafkasos. In 1928, there were 154 refugee families (534 people).

Neos Kafkasos had 348 inhabitants in 1981. In fieldwork done by Riki Van Boeschoten in late 1993, Neos Kafkasos was populated by a Greek population descended from Anatolian Greek refugees who arrived during the population exchange. Pontic Greek was spoken by people over 60, mainly in private.

References 

Populated places in Florina (regional unit)